Siobhan Leachman is a New Zealand citizen scientist, open knowledge advocate, and Wikipedian whose work focusses on natural history.

Leachman is a lawyer by background and a self-described "stay-at-home mother of two". Bored after her children began attending kindergarten, she began her volunteer work at the instigation of her twin sister Victoria Leachman (Head of Collections Access at Te Papa) with the Smithsonian Transcription Center, transcribing diaries and field journals such as those of Vernon and Florence Bailey and categorising bumblebee collections of Arthur Wilson Stelfox. She moved on to volunteer projects with the Biodiversity Heritage Library, Zooniverse, the Australian Museum, and the New Zealand Virtual Herbarium.

In 2014 at the encouragement of the Smithsonian Transcription Center she began working on Wikipedia; her first article, on botanist and collector Charlotte Cortlandt Ellis, was quickly flagged for deletion. She was spending at least two hours a day on Wikipedia, Wikimedia Commons, Wikidata, and iNaturalist, and organised several volunteer events with Wikipedian Mike Dickison. Her Wikipedia work focussed on women in science, neglected scientific collectors, and the endemic moths of New Zealand. Inspired by Ahi Pepe Mothnet, her project to create articles on all 1,800 New Zealand endemic moth species draws on openly-licensed images from iNaturalist, the Auckland Museum, and the New Zealand Arthropod Collection. She has been an advocate of open licenses for digital collections of museums and cultural institutions. She has also worked on creating Wikidata entries and Wikipedia articles for female scientific illustrators in the collection of the Biodiversity Heritage Library.

Leachman has presented at VALA, New Zealand's National Digital Forum,  and WikiDataCon. The Smithsonian invited her to be on the "Build the Crowdsourcing Community of Your Dreams" panel at SXSW in 2016. In 2018 she was awarded a travel scholarship to present at the WikiCite conference in Berkeley, where she spoke about the difficulties of finding metadata on historical biodiversity literature. In 2019 at Biodiversity Next in Leiden she spoke about using Bloodhound Tracker (now Bionomia) to link museum specimen data to collectors.

In 2019 Auckland Museum made Leachman a Companion of Auckland War Memorial Museum in recognition of her work with their openly-licensed digital collection images.

Selected works

References

External links

 
 
 Siobhan Leachman on Tumblr
 "Crowdsourcing & how GLAMs encourage me to participate" (presentation by Leachman at National Digital Forum 2016)
 "Giz it: A journey in reuse" (presentation on behalf of Leachman at National Digital Forum 2019)
 "Sharing Kiwi biodiversity online" (interview with Leachman on RNZ Afternoons)

Living people
21st-century New Zealand lawyers
Year of birth missing (living people)
New Zealand Wikimedians
New Zealand women lawyers
21st-century women lawyers